Marco Galli (5 March 1957 – 3 October 1988) was an Italian water polo player. He competed in the men's tournament at the 1984 Summer Olympics.

See also
 List of world champions in men's water polo
 List of World Aquatics Championships medalists in water polo

References

External links
 

1957 births
1988 deaths
Italian male water polo players
Olympic water polo players of Italy
Water polo players at the 1984 Summer Olympics
Water polo players from Rome